Dobra  is a village in Limanowa County, Lesser Poland Voivodeship, in southern Poland. It is the seat of the gmina (administrative district) called Gmina Dobra.

The village has a population of 3,100.

References

Villages in Limanowa County